Ricardo Fuenzalida (born 23 November 1992) is a Chilean footballer who currently plays for Deportes Santa Cruz.

References

1992 births
Living people
Chilean footballers
Chilean Primera División players
Audax Italiano footballers
Association football midfielders
People from Magallanes Province